Hinepukohurangi: Shrouded in the Mist is Whirimako Black's first album. It won Best Maori Language Album at the 2001 NZ Music Awards.

Track listing
"Engari Te Titi"
"Te Tini O Toi"
"E Kui Kumara"
"Moumou"
"E Kui Mareta"
"Torete Te Kiore"
"Kua Tata"
"Mihi Ki Te Wao-nui"
"Taku Rakau E"
"He Taonga"
"Hinekoti"
"He Koha Kii Na Taku Kui"

References

2000 debut albums
Whirimako Black albums